William F. Watts Jr. (born May 5, 1939) is a retired American professional wrestler, promoter and former American football player. Watts garnered fame under his "Cowboy" gimmick in his wrestling career, and then as a promoter in the Mid-South United States, which grew to become the Universal Wrestling Federation (UWF).

In 1992, Watts was the Executive Vice President of World Championship Wrestling (WCW) but after clashes with management over a number of issues, as well as feeling pressure from Hank Aaron over a racially insensitive interview, he resigned. He was subsequently replaced by Ole Anderson.

In 1995, Watts briefly worked as a booker for the World Wrestling Federation (WWF). In 2009, he was inducted into the WWE Hall of Fame.

Football career
Watts played as a linebacker for his high school football team, the Putnam City Pirates. Bud Wilkinson recruited him to play for the Oklahoma Sooners, where he played as a guard during his sophomore and junior years. However, his junior year was marred by a near fatal car accident involving him and his mother, resulting in him going into a coma. When he came out, he had lost a significant amount of weight, and had to put it back on, despite the coaches at the time preferring their players to be small and quick, which Watts had struggled with before the accident. Former Sooners teammate Wahoo McDaniel (then of the Houston Oilers of the AFL), introduced him to professional wrestling for the first time, something McDaniel did in the off-season. Watts turned professional in 1961 and joined the Oilers, but did not last long there, and according to a shoot interview, he left after knocking out a coach.

Through McDaniel's friendship with defensive coach Bob Griffin, Watts played for the Indianapolis Warriors of the United Football League, while also being able to wrestle for NWA Indianapolis. Watts then had a try-out with the Minnesota Vikings of the National Football League (NFL), but after a discussion with general manager Jim Finks, who wanted him to quit his wrestling career, Watts left the Vikings having decided he could make more money back in Oklahoma.

Professional wrestling career

Wrestling career (1962–1979)
As a professional wrestler, he famously feuded with WWWF Champion Bruno Sammartino, but was unable to win the title. In the 1960s, he wrestled in many areas, such as San Francisco, Chicago, St. Louis, and even Japan for All Japan Pro Wrestling (AJPW). During these periods, Watts challenged for both the National Wrestling Alliance (NWA) and American Wrestling Association (AWA) versions of the World Title.

Booking career

Mid-South Wrestling / Universal Wrestling Federation (1979–1987)
Watts is perhaps even more famous for being a pioneering promoter in the Mid-South area of the United States, with his base of operation being in the Shreveport, Louisiana area. His promotion was known as Mid-South Wrestling. He is often credited with creating the current and popular "episodic" style of TV wrestling, building solid creative storylines week-on-week, with an emphasis on solid in-ring action with dependable wrestlers like "Dr. Death" Steve Williams, The Junkyard Dog, Ted DiBiase and Jim Duggan. He is an outspoken critic on breaking kayfabe and "smart" wrestling fans. A Watts-run promotion always had face and heel wrestlers dress in different locker rooms and to have faces and heels not meet publicly. He has also been known to revamp his booking plans in order to protect the business from such fans.

After losing over half a million dollars, Watts sold the UWF to NWA Mid-Atlantic's Jim Crockett Promotions, who kept many of their stars, such as Sting. Instead of having UWF as a separate organization, Crockett sent his mid-card wrestlers to the UWF and had them quickly win their titles. Eventually, the UWF folded, and Crockett would be bought out by Ted Turner in 1988. In April 1989, after firing George Scott, WCW offered Watts the chance to book, but he declined the offer and WCW instead decided to go with a booking committee, which included Ric Flair and Kevin Sullivan. It is said that Flair would seek advice on booking or how to formulate a document correctly from Jim Cornette, who is often miscredited as a member of the actual committee.

World Championship Wrestling (1992–1993)
Watts became Executive Vice President of World Championship Wrestling (succeeding Kip Frey) in 1992. He took many of his old-school values with him, such as banning moves from the top rope and the babyfaces and heels separation. His tenure was not long, nor were his ideas overly embraced. According to his autobiography, Controversy Creates Ca$h, Eric Bischoff (who worked under Watts at the time) felt Watts would intimidate anyone he was talking to and was only interested in taking the WCW product back to 1970s standards, with poorly lit arenas and house shows in remote rural towns.

The circumstances of Watts' departure in 1993 are controversial. Prior to 1992, he had given an interview to a wrestling newsletter. Most notably, Watts had commented on Lester Maddox, a restaurant owner (and future Governor of Georgia) who was told he had to serve black people but instead closed down his business. Watts felt Maddox stood up for what he believed in and acted accordingly. He also made several other controversial statements pertaining to race and sexual orientation. When he was hired by WCW, Watts had explained the situation to Turner president Bill Shaw, apparently to his satisfaction. However, a year later wrestling journalist Mark Madden brought the interview to the attention of Hank Aaron, himself a vice president in the Turner organization with the Atlanta Braves, who then pushed for Watts' removal. While Madden takes credit for Watts getting fired, Watts himself disputes this account, saying he was not fired for the comments but quit his position out of frustration over "backstabbing" by Shaw and (unbeknownst to Shaw) had already resigned by the time Aaron got the newsletter. Watts was replaced by Ole Anderson.

World Wrestling Federation (1995)
Watts later went on to a position of booking power in the World Wrestling Federation (WWF). His tenure there was short, as he stated in later interviews that he was only there on a three-month contract and had no interest in staying long-term. On April 4, 2009, Watts was inducted into the WWE Hall of Fame as a part of the Class of 2009.

Personal life
Watts has five children. From his first marriage, he has a son, William III (nicknamed Biff), and from his second marriage, he has three sons, Joel, Erik, Micah and a daughter, Ene. In March 2006, Watts released his autobiography The Cowboy and the Cross: The Bill Watts Story: Rebellion, Wrestling and Redemption through ECW Press. The book chronicles his upbringing, his career as first a wrestler, then a promoter, along with events in his personal life. The book also details his becoming a born-again Christian.

Watts is a Republican, and in an ROH shoot interview with Jim Cornette, filmed in 2006, he criticised Bill Clinton and the Democrats numerous times. He also said, "All men are equal, but some men are more talented than others, and worth more."

Watts served as co-host of a sports talk radio show on The Sports Animal in Tulsa, Oklahoma until late 2008. He was a longtime resident of Bixby, a Tulsa suburb.

Championships and accomplishments

American Wrestling Alliance
AWA United States Heavyweight Championship (1 time)
Cauliflower Alley Club
Other honoree (2001)
Championship Wrestling from Florida
NWA Florida Heavyweight Championship (3 times)
NWA Southern Heavyweight Championship (Florida version) (1 time)
George Tragos/Lou Thesz Professional Wrestling Hall of Fame
Class of 2013
Gulf Coast Championship Wrestling
NWA Gulf Coast Heavyweight Championship (1 time)
Japan Wrestling Association
NWA International Tag Team Championship (1 time) – with Tarzan Tyler
Mid-South Sports
NWA Georgia Heavyweight Championship (1 time)
NWA Tri-State / Mid-South Wrestling Association
Mid-South North American Heavyweight Championship (2 times)
Mid-South Tag Team Championship (1 time) – with Buck Robley
NWA Louisiana Tag Team Championship (1 time) – with Buck Robley
NWA North American Heavyweight Championship (Tri-State version) (7 times)
NWA Tri-State Brass Knuckles Championship (2 times)
NWA Tri-State Tag Team Championship (5 times) – with Jerry Kozak (1), Billy Red Lyons (1), Greg Valentine (1), Billy Robinson (1) and Buck Robley (1)
Professional Wrestling Hall of Fame
Class of 2013
Southwest Sports, Inc.
NWA Texas Heavyweight Championship (1 time)
World Wide Wrestling Federation / World Wrestling Entertainment
WWWF United States Tag Team Championship (1 time) – with Gorilla Monsoon
WWE Hall of Fame (Class of 2009)
Wrestling Observer Newsletter awards
 Most Obnoxious (1992)
Wrestling Observer Newsletter Hall of Fame (Class of 1996)

References
 Notes

 Bibliography

External links

Professional Wrestling Hall of Fame Profile
 

1939 births
American football defensive linemen
American male professional wrestlers
American male television writers
American Christians
American television writers
Living people
Oklahoma Republicans
Oklahoma Sooners football players
People from Bixby, Oklahoma
Sportspeople from Oklahoma City
Professional wrestlers from Oklahoma
Professional wrestling announcers
Professional wrestling promoters
Professional wrestling trainers
Professional wrestling writers
WWE executives
WWE Hall of Fame inductees
World Championship Wrestling executives
People from Walton County, Florida
Professional Wrestling Hall of Fame and Museum
Houston Oilers players
Minnesota Vikings players
20th-century professional wrestlers
NWA Florida Heavyweight Champions
NWA Southern Heavyweight Champions (Florida version)
NWA International Tag Team Champions
NWA Georgia Heavyweight Champions